Lyudmyla Lemeshko (born 12 November 1979) is a Ukrainian football midfielder, currently playing for Zorky Krasnogorsk in the Russian Championship. She has also played for Lehenda Chernihiv, Gömrükçü Baku, Ryazan VDV and ShVSM Izmailovo, winning five Ukrainian Leagues with Lehenda.

She is a member of the Ukrainian national team since 1997, and took part in the 2009 European Championship.

Honours
Lehenda Chernihiv
 Ukrainian Women's League: 2000, 2001, 2002
 Women's Cup: 2001, 2002

Individual
 Best Player of Lehenda Chernihiv (1): 1996

References

1979 births
Living people
Footballers from Chernihiv
Women's association football midfielders
Ukrainian women's footballers
Ukraine women's international footballers
WFC Lehenda-ShVSM Chernihiv players
Ryazan-VDV players
CSP Izmailovo players
FC Zorky Krasnogorsk (women) players
Ukrainian expatriate women's footballers
Ukrainian expatriate sportspeople in Russia
Expatriate women's footballers in Russia
Ukrainian expatriate sportspeople in Azerbaijan